is a Japanese writer. Her book Hyakunen doro (100 Years Mud) won the 154th Akutagawa Prize and the 49th Shincho Prize for New Writers.

Biography

Ishii was born in Hirakata, Osaka and lived there during her early school years. She later moved to Tokyo, where she graduated from Waseda University and worked at a variety of part-time jobs, including department store salesperson and snack hostess, while writing stories in her free time. After almost winning a literary prize at age 33 she moved back to her parents' home in Osaka to try writing full-time. In 2000 Ishii returned to Tokyo to pursue graduate study in Buddhism at the University of Tokyo. 

In 2014 Ishii moved to Chennai, India, where her husband worked as a Sanskrit language researcher, and she started working as a Japanese language teacher. She made her literary debut at age 54 with her novel Hyakunen doro (100 Years Mud), about the aftermath of a once-in-a-century flood. The story was based on her experiences in Chennai during the 2015 South Indian floods. Hyakunen doro won the 49th Shincho Prize for New Writers. It also won the 158th Akutagawa Prize, which she shared with Chisako Wakatake.

She has named Gabriel García Márquez and Yukio Mishima as two of her favorite authors.

Recognition
 2017 49th Shincho Prize for New Writers
 2018 158th Akutagawa Prize (2017下)

Works

 Hyakunen doro, Shinchosha, 2018,

References

1963 births
Living people
21st-century Japanese novelists
21st-century Japanese women writers
Japanese women novelists
Akutagawa Prize winners